Clogher is a village in County Tyrone, Northern Ireland, seat of a cathedral, and former parliamentary borough

Clogher may also refer to:
 Clogher (Parliament of Ireland constituency), abolished 1800
 Clogher (barony), a barony
 Bishop of Clogher, post-mediaeval title
 Diocese of Clogher (Roman Catholic), modern diocese
 Diocese of Clogher (Church of Ireland), modern diocese
 Clogher Éire Óg, a Gaelic Athletic Association club
 Baron Clogher, subsidiary title of Terence Lenagh, Earl of Clanconnell in the Peerage of Ireland 
 Clogherhead or Clogher, a village in County Louth
 Clogher, a townland in County Monaghan
 Clogher, Noughaval, a townland in Noughaval civil parish, barony of Kilkenny West, County Westmeath
Cashelmore or Clogher Stone Fort, stone ringfort in County Sligo

See also
 Kiltyclogher, a village in County Leitrim